Manjhi (also spelled as majhee) means village headman or chief 

 Manjhi - The Mountain Man, Indian film
 Manjhi (tribe), a tribe found in the Indian states of Madhya Pradesh and Bihar
 Manjhi (Vidhan Sabha constituency), assembly constituency in Saran district, Bihar, India
 Dashrath Manjhi
 Jitan Ram Manjhi
 An alternate name for the Majhwar caste of Uttar Pradesh, India